Zolotari is a rural locality (a settlement) and the administrative center of Goncharovskoye Rural Settlement, Pallasovsky District, Volgograd Oblast, Russia. The population was 1,394 as of 2010. There are 37 streets.

Geography 
Zolotari is located in on the Caspian Depression, 69 km southwest of Pallasovka (the district's administrative centre) by road. Gonchary is the nearest rural locality.

References 

Rural localities in Pallasovsky District